A Room for London is a temporary structure located on the roof of the Queen Elizabeth Hall on London's South Bank. The structure, designed by architect David Kohn is described as "a one-bedroom installation"  and is shaped to appear like a boat perched on top of a building.

The structure has been in place since 2012 and has acted as a "single-room, boat-shaped hotel", available to be booked for single-night residencies.

A Room for London is one of a number of projects by Living Architecture, a not-for-profit holiday home rental company founded by philosopher and writer Alain de Botton.

Gallery

References

Installation art works